MBT, or N-methyl-N-butyltryptamine, is a lesser-known psychedelic drug. MBT was first synthesized by Alexander Shulgin. In his book TiHKAL (Tryptamines I Have Known and Loved), the minimum dosage is listed as 250-400 mg, and the duration listed as 4–6 hours. MBT produces a heavy body load with dehydration, and causes visuals similar to those of DMT. Very little data exists about the pharmacological properties, metabolism, and toxicity of MBT.

MSBT 
TiHKAL mentions that a structural isomer of MBT exists, with the butyl group attached at the nitrogen atom.  It is known as ''N-s-butyl-N''-methyltryptamine, or MSBT.  However, little is known about its psychoactivity.

See also 
 Tryptamine
 Psychedelics, dissociatives and deliriants

External links 
 MBT Entry in TIHKAL
 MBT entry in TiHKAL • info

Psychedelic tryptamines